Seneanye Betta Lehihi is a South African politician who has been representing the North West in the National Council of Provinces since May 2019. Lehihi is a member of the Economic Freedom Fighters.

Education
Lehihi completed grade 11 at the Tiragalo Secondary School in Leeudoringstad, North West.

Parliamentary career
Lehihi is a member of the Economic Freedom Fighters. After the general election on 8 May 2019, she was elected as a permanent delegate to the National Council of Provinces. She was sworn in as an MP on 23 May 2019. Lehihi is the sole EFF representative in the North West delegation. She received her committee assignments on 24 June.

Committee assignments
Joint Constitutional Review Committee
Select Committee on Education and Technology, Sports, Arts and Culture
Select Committee on Health and Social Services
Select Committee on Land Reform, Environment, Mineral Resources and Energy
Select Committee on Public Enterprises and Communication

References

External links

Living people
Year of birth missing (living people)
People from North West (South African province)
21st-century South African politicians
21st-century South African women politicians
Economic Freedom Fighters politicians
Members of the National Council of Provinces
Tswana people
Women members of the National Council of Provinces